Ashley Howard is an American college basketball coach. He was the head men's basketball coach at La Salle University, a position he held from 2018 to 2022. He was previously an assistant coach at Villanova University.

Background
Howard's parents were Maurice Howard and Diane Coleman, the former of who played college basketball at the University of Maryland, and was a second round draft choice of the NBA's Cleveland Cavaliers in 1976. He also played for the New Orleans Jazz. According to Chris Mack, Xavier head coach, Howard has "been around the game his entire life. He is a tireless worker and will bring energy every single day to the practice floor. He's worked with countless pros even before he hit the college floor in a coaching capacity. It was very evident in talking to some of his former players that Ashley deeply impacts the players he coaches."

Education
Howard graduated from Monsignor Bonner High School. He graduated from Drexel University with a degree in communications in 2004.

Basketball career
Howard averaged 8.9 points and a team-high 4.9 assists per game with the Drexel Dragons. Howard was a guard for the team between 1999 and 2002, only stopping due to an injury. At that point he became a student assistant coach at Drexel University until 2003. He was co-director of the Eastern Invitational Basketball Camp. In 2004 he became head coach John Giannini's assistant at La Salle Explorers. In 2006 he was an assistant coach of the Jamaica National team, accompanying the squad on its Olympic qualifying bid in Kingston. In 2008 he went back to Drexel as assistant coach to Bruiser Flint.

Villanova

Howard joined the Villanova basketball staff in June 2013 and has played a key role as the program has posted more than 140 victories, four Big East regular season titles and two NCAA national championships in that stretch.

Villanova head coach Jay Wright said: "We're proud to have Ashley join our Villanova Basketball family. I have known Ashley since he was a high school player. He has deep roots in Philadelphia's basketball tradition and gained an appreciation for the Augustinian values during his days as a student at Monsignor Bonner High School. He will take great pride in representing Villanova."

Howard earned two NCAA Division 1 men's basketball tournament titles with Villanova in 2016 and again in 2018.

La Salle
Howard was considered a top candidate for La Salle University's head coaching job. On April 8, 2018, La Salle announced him as the next head coach of the Explorers, succeeding his former boss John Giannini. During his first season, the Explorers finished 10–21. Howard guided the team to a 15–15 record in the 2019–20 season. Howard was fired in 2022 after an 11–19 season.

Personal life
Howard married Ariana Casanovas in August 2017. Howard's daughter, Journey, was born in 2014.

Head coaching record

References

External links
 La Salle profile
 Villanova profile

Year of birth missing (living people)
Living people
American men's basketball players
Basketball coaches from Pennsylvania
Basketball players from Philadelphia
College men's basketball head coaches in the United States
Drexel Dragons men's basketball players
La Salle Explorers men's basketball coaches
Point guards
Villanova Wildcats men's basketball coaches
Xavier Musketeers men's basketball coaches